In electron energy loss spectroscopy (EELS) a material is exposed to a beam of electrons with a known, narrow range of kinetic energies. Some of the electrons will undergo inelastic scattering, which means that they lose energy and have their paths slightly and randomly deflected.  The amount of energy loss can be measured via an electron spectrometer and interpreted in terms of what caused the energy loss.  Inelastic interactions include phonon excitations, inter- and intra-band transitions, plasmon excitations, inner shell ionizations, and Cherenkov radiation.  The inner-shell ionizations are particularly useful for detecting the elemental components of a material.  For example, one might find that a larger-than-expected number of electrons comes through the material with 285 eV less energy than they had when they entered the material.  This is approximately the amount of energy needed to remove an inner-shell electron from a carbon atom,  which can be taken as evidence that there is a significant amount of carbon present in the sample.  With some care, and looking at a wide range of energy losses, one can determine the types of atoms, and the numbers of atoms of each type, being struck by the beam.  The scattering angle (that is, the amount that the electron's path is deflected) can also be measured, giving information about the dispersion relation of whatever material excitation caused the inelastic scattering.

History
The technique was developed by James Hillier and RF Baker in the mid-1940s but was not widely used over the next 50 years, only becoming more widespread in research in the 1990s due to advances in microscope instrumentation and vacuum technology.  With modern instrumentation becoming widely available in laboratories worldwide, the technical and scientific developments from the mid-1990s have been rapid.  The technique is able to take advantage of modern aberration-corrected probe forming systems to attain spatial resolutions down to  ~0.1 nm, while with a monochromated electron source and/or careful deconvolution the energy resolution can be 0.1 eV or better. This has enabled detailed measurements of the atomic and electronic properties of single columns of atoms, and in a few cases, of single atoms.

Comparison with EDX
EELS is spoken of as being complementary to energy-dispersive x-ray spectroscopy (variously called EDX, EDS, XEDS, etc.), which is another common spectroscopy technique available on many electron microscopes.  EDX excels at identifying the atomic composition of a material, is quite easy to use, and is particularly sensitive to heavier elements.  EELS has historically been a more difficult technique but is in principle capable of measuring atomic composition, chemical bonding, valence and conduction band electronic properties, surface properties, and element-specific pair distance distribution functions. EELS tends to work best at relatively low atomic numbers, where the excitation edges tend to be sharp, well-defined, and at experimentally accessible energy losses (the signal being very weak beyond about 3 keV energy loss).  EELS is perhaps best developed for the elements ranging from carbon through the 3d transition metals (from scandium to zinc). For carbon, an experienced spectroscopist can tell at a glance the differences between diamond, graphite, amorphous carbon, and "mineral" carbon (such as the carbon appearing in carbonates).  The spectra of 3d transition metals can be analyzed to identify the oxidation states of the atoms.  Cu(I), for instance, has a different so-called "white-line" intensity ratio than Cu(II) does.  This ability to "fingerprint" different forms of the same element is a strong advantage of EELS over EDX.  The difference is mainly due to the difference in energy resolution between the two techniques (~1 eV or better for EELS, perhaps a few tens of eV for EDX).

Variants

There are several basic flavors of EELS, primarily classified by the geometry and by the kinetic energy of the incident electrons (typically measured in kiloelectron-volts, or keV).  Probably the most common today is transmission EELS, in which the kinetic energies are typically 100 to 300 keV and the incident electrons pass entirely through the material sample.  Usually this occurs in a transmission electron microscope (TEM), although some dedicated systems exist which enable extreme resolution in terms of energy and momentum transfer at the expense of spatial resolution.

Other flavors include reflection EELS (including reflection high-energy electron energy-loss spectroscopy (RHEELS)), typically at 10 to 30 keV, and aloof EELS (sometimes called near-field EELS), in which the electron beam does not in fact strike the sample but instead interacts with it via the long-ranged Coulomb interaction. Aloof EELS is particularly sensitive to surface properties but is limited to very small energy losses such as those associated with surface plasmons or direct interband transitions.

Within transmission EELS, the technique is further subdivided into valence EELS (which measures plasmons and interband transitions) and inner-shell ionization EELS (which provides much the same information as x-ray absorption spectroscopy, but from much smaller volumes of material). The dividing line between the two, while somewhat ill-defined, is in the vicinity of 50 eV energy loss.

Instrumental developments have opened up the ultra-low energy loss part of the EELS spectrum, enabling vibrational spectroscopy in the TEM. Both IR-active and non-IR-active vibrational modes are present in EELS.

EEL spectrum 
The electron energy loss (EEL) spectrum can be roughly split into two different regions: the low-loss spectrum (up until about 50eV in energy loss) and the high-loss spectrum. The low-loss spectrum contains the zero-loss peak as well as the plasmon peaks, and contains information about the band structure and dielectric properties of the sample. The high-loss spectrum contains the ionisation edges that arise due to inner shell ionisations in the sample. These are characteristic to the species present in the sample, and as such can be used to obtain accurate information about the chemistry of a sample.

Thickness measurements
EELS allows quick and reliable measurement of local thickness in transmission electron microscopy. The most efficient procedure is the following:
 Measure the energy loss spectrum in the energy range about −5..200 eV (wider better). Such measurement is quick (milliseconds) and thus can be applied to materials normally unstable under electron beams.
 Analyse the spectrum: (i) extract zero-loss peak (ZLP) using standard routines; (ii) calculate integrals under the ZLP (I0) and under the whole spectrum (I).
 The thickness t is calculated as mfp*ln(I/I0). Here mfp is the mean free path of electron inelastic scattering, which has been tabulated for most elemental solids and oxides.

The spatial resolution of this procedure is limited by the plasmon localization and is about 1 nm, meaning that spatial thickness maps can be measured in scanning transmission electron microscopy with ~1 nm resolution.

Pressure measurements
The intensity and position of low-energy EELS peaks are affected by pressure. This fact allows mapping local pressure with ~1 nm spatial resolution.
 Peak shift method is reliable and straightforward. The peak position is calibrated by independent (usually optical) measurement using a diamond anvil cell. However, the spectral resolution of most EEL spectrometers (0.3-2 eV, typically 1 eV) is often too crude for the small pressure-induced shifts. Therefore, the sensitivity and accuracy of this method is relatively poor. Nevertheless, pressures as small as 0.2 GPa inside helium bubbles in aluminum have been measured.
 Peak intensity method relies on pressure-induced change in the intensity of dipole-forbidden transitions. Because this intensity is zero for zero pressure the method is relatively sensitive and accurate. However, it requires existence of allowed and forbidden transitions of similar energies and thus is only applicable to specific systems, e.g., Xe bubbles in aluminum.

Use in confocal geometry
Scanning confocal electron energy loss microscopy (SCEELM) is a new analytical microscopy tool that enables a double corrected transmission electron microscope to achieve sub-10 nm depth resolution in depth sectioning imaging of nanomaterials. It was previously termed as energy filtered scanning confocal electron microscopy due to the lack to full spectrum acquisition capability (only a small energy window on the order of 5 eV can be used at a time). SCEELM takes advantages of the newly developed chromatic aberration corrector which allows electrons of more than 100 eV of energy spread to be focused to roughly the same focal plane. It has been demonstrated that a simultaneous acquisition of the zero loss, low-loss, and core loss signals up to 400 eV in the confocal geometry with depth discrimination capability.

See also
 Energy filtered transmission electron microscopy
 Magic angle (EELS)
 Transmission electron microscopy
 Scanning transmission electron microscopy

References

Further reading

External links
 A Database of EELS fine structure fingerprints at Cornell
 A database of EELS and X-Ray excitation spectra
 Cornell Spectrum Imager, an EELS Analysis open-source plugin for ImageJ
 HyperSpy, a hyperspectral data analysis Python toolbox especially well suited for EELS data analysis
 EELSMODEL, software to quantify Electron Energy Loss (EELS) spectra by using model fitting

Electron spectroscopy
Scientific techniques